The 2nd Gujarat Legislative Assembly election was held in 1962. It was the first election after forming of two states Gujarat and Maharastra following split of Bombay State. Indian National Congress won 113 seats out of 154 seats. While, Swatantra Party won 26 seats and Praja Socialist Party won seven seats. 

A total of 500 men and 19 women contested the election. Total 143 men and 11 women won in the elections. The number of polling stations was 10,960 and the number of electors per polling station was 870.

Results

Elected members

See also
 1962 elections in India

References

External link
 

State Assembly elections in Gujarat
1960s in Gujarat
Gujarat